AS Batè Nafadji is an association football club from Guinea. They are members of the Guinée Championnat National.

References 

Football clubs in Guinea